PalaArgento, full name Palazzetto dello Sport Mario Argento, is an indoor sporting arena in Naples, Italy. Built in 1963, the capacity of the arena is 8,000 spectators. It was the home arena of the Partenope Napoli basketball team of the Lega Basket Serie A. 

The Norwegian band A-ha played there in 1988.

External links
Arena information

Indoor arenas in Italy